Twin Cities Academy (TCA) is a charter middle and high school including sixth grade in Saint Paul, Minnesota, United States. Twin Cities Academy established a high school in 2006.

External links 
 

Charter schools in Minnesota
Education in Saint Paul, Minnesota
Public middle schools in Minnesota
Schools in Ramsey County, Minnesota